Lagenicella is a genus of bryozoans belonging to the family Teuchoporidae.

The species of this genus are found in North America.

Species:

Lagenicella admiranda 
Lagenicella cylindrica 
Lagenicella echinata 
Lagenicella helmbergensis 
Lagenicella hippocrepis 
Lagenicella lacunosa 
Lagenicella marginata 
Lagenicella mexicana 
Lagenicella neosocialis 
Lagenicella nipponica 
Lagenicella punctulata 
Lagenicella spinulosa 
Lagenicella variabilis

References

Bryozoan genera